Bettina Sharada Bäumer (born 12 April 1940) is an Austrian-born Indian scholar of religion. Bäumer has been described by Vandana Parthasarathy, writing in The Hindu, as a "renowned Indologist, one of the foremost expounders of Kashmir Saivism and a well-known figure in the field of inter-religious dialogue". She was awarded the Austrian Decoration for Science and Art by Government of Austria in 2012 and Padma Shri by Government of India in 2015 for her contribution to Literature and Education.

Early life and education
She was born in Salzburg on 12 April 1940 to Prof. Eduard Bäumer and Valerie Bäumer and secured her High School Leaving Certificate (Matura) in Salzburg in 1959. She pursued higher studies in Philosophy, Religion, Theology and Music at the Universities of Salzburg, Wien, Zurich, Rome and Munich between 1959 and 1967. Her Ph.D. thesis Creation as Play: The concept of Lila in Hinduism, its Philosophical and Theological Significance was presented the University of Munich where she secured her doctorate of philosophy in 1967. Bäumer took the Indian name "Sharada" while applying for citizenship, and became an Indian citizen in 2011.

Career
She was appointed a professor at the Institute for the Study of Religions, University of Vienna in 1997 and in 2002 gained a doctorate honoris causa from the University of Salzburg, the first to do so from the university's Faculty of Theology.

She has lived in India for over four decades, having found "belonging in Hinduism" and is quoted as emphasising that; "getting to know another religion does not permit using it as a quarry to be mined" She conducted post-doctoral research in Indian philosophy and Sanskrit at Banaras Hindu University (Varanasi),where she worked as an assistant and lecturer, under a reciprocal scholarship from the government of India. She has done field work in Odisha.

She worked in the University of Vienna (Indology) and as director of the Research of the Alice Bonner Foundation for Fundamental Research in Indian Art and has been a visiting professor at University of Vienna, University of Salzburg and the University of Berne. She has been honorary co-ordinator of the Kalatattvakosa programme, and editor of Kalatattvakosa: a Lexicon of Fundamental Concepts of the Indian Arts, respectively conducted and published by the Indira Gandhi National Centre for the Arts. She has been a fellow at the Harvard University and at the Indian Institute of Advanced Study, Shimla. In 2009 she was director  of Samvidalaya at the Abhinavagupta Research Library, Varanasi. She was the co-chairperson of the fifteenth World Sanskrit Conference, held in New Delhi in 2012.

Abhinavagupta's hermeneutics
Surekha Dhaleta, in an article in the Times of India, described her as passionate about Kashmir Shaivism, as manifest in the commentaries of its leading commentator Abhinavagupta. She quotes Dr. Bäumer thus; "There is a lot of misrepresentation and misunderstanding about tantra, which forms the core of Kashmir Shaivism and has been generally misunderstood as black magic or witchcraft. Tantra is fascinating and is very rich and beautiful and related to practical life. It speaks about cosmic energies. The book Abhinavagupta's Hermeneutics of the Absolute: Annutraprakriya, an interpretation of his Paratrisika Vivarana aims to present tantra and its interpretation in a scholarly way. I would appeal to youngsters to not see Hindu philosophy with dry speculation as it is very rich in knowledge and a great repository of traditions". The book provides extensive translations, commentary and in-depth interpretation of Abhinavgupta's theories.

References

External links
 Personal web site

Living people
1940 births
Writers from Salzburg
Austrian emigrants to India
Austrian women academics
Indian women scholars
Austrian Indologists
Indian Indologists
Hindu studies scholars
Indian Sanskrit scholars
Naturalised citizens of India
Indian people of Austrian descent
Writers from Varanasi
University of Salzburg alumni
Ludwig Maximilian University of Munich alumni
Banaras Hindu University alumni
Academic staff of Banaras Hindu University
Academic staff of the University of Vienna
Academic staff of the University of Salzburg
Academic staff of the University of Bern
Harvard Divinity School faculty
Recipients of the Austrian Cross of Honour for Science and Art, 1st class
Recipients of the Padma Shri in literature & education
21st-century Austrian women writers
21st-century Indian women writers
21st-century Indian writers